Dynamic imaging is the amalgamation of digital imaging, image editing, and workflow automation. It is used to automate the creation of images by zooming, panning, colorize and performing other image processing and color management operations on a copy of a digital master.

Categories
Dynamic imaging technology falls into three categories:

 Script dynamic imaging: A shell script is used to automate repeated tasks in programs.
 Batch dynamic imaging (IIP based imaging server): An engine is used in batch processing of images.
 Real-time dynamic imaging: An imaging server allows realtime rendering of images, text, logos and colorization based on internal and external data sources.

Device transcoding delivers real-time dynamic imaging features to any device or display without the need of predefined templates. Device transcoded imaging can be used for mobile devices or as an engine behind RFID to create visual messages/offers in narrowcasting/1to1 environments without the need of heavy (flash) clients.

References

Image processing
Graphics software